Six ships of the Royal Navy have been named HMS Edinburgh, for the Scottish city of Edinburgh. In addition, one ship of the Royal Navy has carried the similar name HMS Duke of Edinburgh.

HMS Edinburgh
  was a 32-gun fifth rate, originally the Scottish ship Royal William. She was transferred from the Royal Scottish Navy in 1707, and was sunk as a breakwater in 1709.
She was renamed HMS Edinburgh in 1721, rebuilt twice in 1721 and 1744, before being broken up in 1771.
  was a 74-gun third rate launched in 1811. She was converted to screw propulsion in 1846 before being sold in 1865.
She was sold in 1910.
  was a  light cruiser launched in 1939. She was damaged by a torpedo and then scuttled in the Barents Sea in mid-1942.
  was a Type 42 destroyer launched in 1983 and decommissioned on 6 June 2013.
  will be the name of Type 26 frigate.

Battle honours
 Finisterre II 1747
 Cape Francois 1757
 Syria 1840
 Baltic 1854–55
 Norway 1940–41
 Bismarck 1941
 Atlantic 1941
 Malta Convoys 1941
 Arctic 1941–42

HMS Duke of Edinburgh
  was a  armoured cruiser launched in 1904 and sold in 1920.
 One of the planned CVA-01 aircraft carriers of the 1960s was tentatively named HMS Duke of Edinburgh but the design was never constructed.

Battle Honours
Jutland 1916

References
 

Royal Navy ship names
Culture in Edinburgh